Hagenberg im Mühlkreis is a town in the district of Freistadt in the Austrian state of Upper Austria 20 km from Linz. Hagenberg became known for Softwarepark Hagenberg a major technology park focusing on IT, with research, education and business.

Population

Research institutes in Hagenberg 
RISC
FLLL
Software Competence Center Hagenberg (SCCH)
 Institute for Application Oriented Knowledge Processing (FAW)
 FH OÖ Research & Development GmbH - Research Center Hagenberg
 Josef Ressel Zentrum - Heureka!
 Research Studio Austria NiCE
 Austrian Grid Development Center (AGEZ)

Education 
Johannes Kepler Universität Linz has four institutes in Hagenberg: RISC, FAW, FLLL, GeoGebra
University of Applied Sciences Upper Austria - School of Informatics, Communication and Media (Fachhochschule Hagenberg)
ISI-Hagenberg - The International School for Informatics

Business 
More than 50 IT companies in the Softwarepark Hagenberg.

Sport facilities in Hagenberg include a soccer field, three volleyball fields, a bouldering hall and a fishing pond.

References

External links
FH Hagenberg — University for computer-based studies
Hagenberg Web site
Softwarepark Hagenberg
FH-Studengänge Oberösterreich, Campus Hagenberg Web site
RISC Web site
ISI Web site 
Fire Brigade Hagenberg
Software Competence Center Hagenberg

Cities and towns in Freistadt District